Subhash Mendhapurkar (born: Solapur, Maharashtra) is an Indian social activist based in the state of Himachal Pradesh, active in the fields of Women Self-reliance, Rural Self governance, Rural Healthcare, AntiAlcoholism, Microfinance, Water management and Ecomanagement. He is the founder and Director of SUTRA (Society for Social Uplift Through Rural Action), a Non-governmental organization which has been credited for the Socioeconomical transformation of thousands of illiterate rural women, especially the widowed and divorced ones through various initiatives in the foothills of the Himalayas of the Shimla and Solan area. Subhash is the recipient of various awards and accolades including National Sarda Equal Opportunities Award, Man of the year award, 2008 and Peace award, 2005. He is best credited for stabilizing the otherwise dropping sex ratio in Solan District in Himachal Pradesh. Mendhapurkar is an alumnus of the prestigious Tata Institute of Social Sciences and visits International Centre for Integrated Mountain Development, Kathmandu.

References

External links
SUTRA - Official website

Living people
Year of birth missing (living people)
Marathi people
Activists from Maharashtra
Indian civil rights activists
Nonviolence advocates
Indian human rights activists
Tata Institute of Social Sciences alumni